The 2008 Monte Carlo Rally, officially 76ème Rallye Automobile de Monte-Carlo, was the 76th Monte Carlo Rally and the first round of the 2008 World Rally Championship season. The rally took place during January 24–27, 2008, beginning with two stages driven in darkness throughout on Thursday and ending with a short super special around the harbour area of the Grand Prix circuit in Monaco on Sunday.

Sébastien Loeb took a record fifth Monte Carlo win for the Citroën Total World Rally Team. Ford's Mikko Hirvonen was second and Subaru's Chris Atkinson third, after a tight battle with François Duval; drivers finished the final Super Special Stage with exact same times and ended the event with just above 1s time gap between them. Petter Solberg was fifth, followed by Gigi Galli, Jean-Marie Cuoq, Per-Gunnar Andersson, Henning Solberg and Matthew Wilson. Dani Sordo and Jari-Matti Latvala both retired from day three, but continued under the SupeRally rules and finished 11th and 12th respectively.

Results

Special stages 
All dates and times are CET (UTC+1).

Championship standings after the event

Drivers' championship

Manufacturers' championship

References

External links 

 Standings at eWRC

Monte Carlo
2008
Rally
Monte